Taksony (also Taxis or Tocsun; before or around 931 – early 970s) was the Grand Prince of the Hungarians after their catastrophic defeat in the 955 Battle of Lechfeld. In his youth he had participated in plundering raids in Western Europe, but during his reign the Hungarians only targeted the Byzantine Empire. The Gesta Hungarorum recounts that significant Muslim and Pecheneg groups settled in Hungary under Taksony.

Early life
Taksony was the son of Zoltán, according to the Gesta Hungarorum (written around 1200). The same source adds that Taksony's mother was an unnamed daughter of Menumorut, a local ruler defeated by the conquering Hungarians shortly before 907. Its unknown author also says that Taksony was born "in the year of Our Lord's incarnation 931". The Gesta Hungarorum reports that Zoltán abdicated in favor of Taksony in 947, three years before his own death.

However, modern historians have challenged existing information on Taksony's early life. A nearly-contemporaneous source—Liudprand of Cremona's Retribution—narrates that Taksony led a plundering raid against Italy in 947, which suggests that he was born considerably earlier than 931. His father's reign was preserved only in the Gesta Hungarorum; its anonymous author lists Zoltán among the grand princes, and all later Hungarian monarchs were descended from him. The Byzantine Emperor Constantine VII Porphyrogenitus wrote around 950 that Fajsz, Taksony's cousin, was grand prince of the Hungarians at that time.

Reign

A later source, Johannes Aventinus, writes that Taksony fought in the Battle of Lechfeld on August 10, 955. There, future Holy Roman Emperor Otto I routed an 8,000-strong Hungarian army. If this report is reliable, Taksony was one of the few Hungarian leaders to survive the battlefield. Modern historians, including Zoltán Kordé and Gyula Kristó, suggest that Fajsz abdicated in favor of Taksony around that time. After that battle the Hungarians' plundering raids in Western Europe stopped, and they were forced to retreat from the lands between the Enns and Traisen rivers. However, the Hungarians continued their incursions into the Byzantine Empire until the 970s.

According to the Gesta Hungarorum, "a great host of Muslims" arrived in Hungary "from the land of Bular" under Taksony. The contemporaneous Abraham ben Jacob also recorded the presence of Muslim merchants from Hungary in Prague in 965. Anonymus also writes of the arrival of Pechenegs during Taksony's reign; he granted them "a land to dwell in the region of Kemej as far as the Tisza". The only sign of a Hungarian connection with Western Europe under Taksony is a report by Liudprand of Cremona. He writes about Zacheus, whom Pope John XII consecrated bishop and "sent to the Hungarians in order to preach that they should attack" the Germans in 963. However, there is no evidence that Zacheus ever arrived in Hungary. Taksony arranged the marriage of his elder son Géza to Sarolt, daughter of Gyula of Transylvania, before his death during the early 970s.

Family
Taksony's marriage to a woman "from the land of the Cumans" was arranged by his father, according to the Gesta Hungarorum. Although this reference to the Cumans is anachronistic, modern historians argue that the Gesta seems to have preserved the memory of the Turkic—Khazar, Pecheneg or Volga Bulgarian—origin of Taksony's wife. Historian György Györffy proposes that a Pecheneg chieftain, Tonuzoba, who received estates from Taksony near the river Tisza, was related to Taksony's wife. The names of two of Taksony's sons (Géza and Michael) have been preserved. The following family tree presents Taksony's ancestry and his offspring.

*Whether Menumorut is an actual or an invented person is debated by modern scholars.**A Khazar, Pecheneg or Volga Bulgarian woman***Kristó writes that she may have been a member of the Rurik dynasty from Kievan Rus'.

References

Sources

Primary sources

Anonymus, Notary of King Béla: The Deeds of the Hungarians (Edited, Translated and Annotated by Martyn Rady and László Veszprémy) (2010). In: Rady, Martyn; Veszprémy, László; Bak, János M. (2010); Anonymus and Master Roger; CEU Press; .
Liudprand of Cremona: Retribution and King Otto (2007). In: The Complete Works of Liudprand of Cremona (Translated by Paolo Squatriti); The Catholic University of Press; .

Secondary sources

|-

930s births
970s deaths
Year of birth uncertain
Year of death uncertain
House of Árpád
Hungarian monarchs
10th-century rulers in Europe
10th-century Hungarian people